Marcellus News is a weekly news publication based in the town of Marcellus, Michigan. The newspaper's motto is "The only newspaper in the world that cares about Marcellus!" The newspaper is owned and published by Moormann Printing Inc. The Marcellus News was established in 1876.

References

External links 
 

Cass County, Michigan
Newspapers published in Michigan